The String Quartet No. 14 in G major, K. 387, nicknamed the "Spring" quartet, was composed by Wolfgang Amadeus Mozart in 1782 while in Vienna. In the composer's inscription on the title page of the autograph score is stated: "li 31 di decembre 1782 in vienna". The work was perhaps edited in 1783. This is the first of the Haydn Quartets, a set of six string quartets he wrote during his first few years in Vienna and dedicated to Joseph Haydn.

Movements
Average performances of the whole string quartet vary in length from 26 to 33 minutes. As with all later Mozart quartets, this quartet has four movements:
I. Allegro vivace assai
II. Menuetto (Trio in G minor)
III. Andante cantabile, in C major
IV. Molto allegro

The first movement, in G major, contrasts fairly diatonic passages with chromatic runs. According to (Williams, 1997) "it must come as something of a surprise to anyone examining this quartet just how much chromaticism there is in it." In contrast to the standard quartet form, which places the minuet as the 3rd movement, this quartet has the minuet as its 2nd movement (another example of this ordering is the String Quartet No. 17). It is a long minuet, written in the tonic key of G major, with its chromatic fourths set apart by note-to-note dynamics changes. Its trio is in G minor and has a suitably darker and more unsettled mood.

The minuet is followed by a slow movement in the subdominant C major, whose theme explores remote key areas.

The fugal theme of four whole notes in the finale points ahead to the finale of Mozart's "Jupiter" Symphony of 1788, a movement which also begins with four whole notes that are used in a fugal fashion, in the coda, and it also points back to Michael Haydn's Symphony No. 23 in which the finale is also a fugato based on a theme of four whole notes, which Mozart copied out the first few bars of and was mistakenly entered into Köchel's original catalog as K. 291.

Notes

References
 John Irving, Mozart, the "Haydn" quartets. Cambridge: Cambridge University Press (1998)
 Williams, Peter F. The chromatic fourth during four centuries of music. Oxford : Clarendon Press ; New York : Oxford University Press, 1997: 130

External links 
 
 
Recording by the Borromeo String Quartet from the Isabella Stewart Gardner Museum in MP3 format

14
Compositions in G major
1782 compositions